Two ships of United States Navy were named USS Isherwood in honor of Rear Admiral Benjamin F. Isherwood.

See also

 , a fleet replenishment oiler launched in 1989 but never completed and sold for scrapping in 2011

United States Navy ship names